Terrasson may refer to:

People

 André Terrasson, French preacher
 Antoine Terrasson, 18th-century French erudite, nephew of Jean
 Gaspard Terrasson, French preacher, brother of André
 Jacky Terrasson, French-American pianist
 Jean Terrasson, 18th-century French writer

 Places

 Beauregard-de-Terrasson, commune in the Dordogne department, France
 Terrasson-Lavilledieu, commune in the Dordogne department, France